Lima 3.31 is an upcoming Paraguayan action film directed and written by Marcelo Torcida. The film stars Oliver Kolker, Joel Casco, Matias Miranda, Valeria Solis, José Maldonado and María Belén.

Plot
In the cheerful Latin America of the 70s an ideological struggle is waged that involves all sectors of society. Dictators and revolutionaries use the kidnapping of people as their preferred methodology to impose their ideas. Valente, the son of a powerful businessman, makes a living working for an insurance company specializing in kidnappings. His mission is to bring the victims to safety.

Cast
 Oliver Kolker as Vicente Valente's father
 Joel Casco as Carlos
 Matias Miranda as Valente
 Valeria Solis as Valente's mother
 José Maldonado as Mendez
 María Belén Fretes as India

Production
In January 2017, the production of the first Paraguayan film shot entirely in English was announced under the title "Eskaton". At the end of October 2020, details of the plot were released and the official title of the film was announced, "Lima 3.31".

References

External links
 

Upcoming films
Paraguayan action films
Films shot in Paraguay
Films set in Paraguay
English-language films
Guaraní-language films